The King of Šumava: The Phantom of the Dark Land is a 2022 three-part adventure miniseries directed by David Ondříček and produced by the production company Lucky Man Films. The series was filmed under the brand Voyo Original. The script was written by Tomáš Vávra and David Ondříček.

Oskar Hes, Jan Nedbal, Halka Třešňáková, Vojtěch Vodochodský, Jan Hájek, Jana Pidrmanová, Gabriela Heclová, Jan Jankovský, Kryštof Mucha, Kristýna Podzimková, Judit Bárdos, Petr Forman, Denis Šafařík, Jaroslav Plesl, Jiří Zeman, Daniela Hirsch and others starred in the series.

Filming took place from March to May 2022, and the crew completed 25 filming days at locations in the Central Bohemia and Pilsen Regions as well as in South Bohemia. Among other things, filming was also done in Šumava in real locations, where the King of Šumava, Josef Hasil, worked with the border guard in the late forties and early fifties. One of the places was the so-called Valley of Death, the area between the Soumar Bridge and the state border.

The series premiered on 23 September 2022 at the Serial Killer international series festival in Brno.

On 23 February 2023 Nova announced that the series was renewed for season 2 and season 3 each consisting of 3 episodes.

Plot
The main character of the series Josef Hasil is based on David Jan Žák's novel The Return of the Šumava King. The story starts in the spring of 1948, when Hasil works in the kitchen of the National Security Corps in Zvonková as a cook. He is twenty-four years old. He experienced the war in a German labor camp and among partisans. He is not interested in politics at all, but the rapidly closing borders, the fear of the World War III and his ability to transfer through the Šumava mountains from East to West predestined him to become a smuggler. David Jan Žák's novel is based on Hasil's memories, eyewitness accounts and archive documents.

Cast 
Oskar Hes as Josef Hasil
Jan Nedbal as Bohumil Hasil
Halka Třešňáková as Rozálie Hasilová
Vojtěch Vodochodský as Zdeněk Vyleta
Jan Hájek as František Vávra
Jana Pidrmanová as Anna Vávrová
Gabriela Heclová as Marie Vávrová
Jan Jankovský as Antonín Podzimek
Kryštof Mucha as Václav Kott
Kristýna Podzimková as Vlasta, Josef's lover
Judit Bárdos as Klára, Josef's lover
Denis Šafařík as Mlíčňák
Petr Forman as hlídač Jaromír
Jaroslav Plesl as second lieutenant Machart
Jiří Zeman as Egon Brodský
Daniela Hirsch as Anna Bezcená

Episodes

Reception
Series was nominated for Czech Lion Award in categories Best Television Film or Miniseries and Best Music.

References

External links 
Official site
IMDB site

Czech adventure television series
Czech crime television series
Czech thriller television series
2022 Czech television series debuts
TV Nova (Czech TV channel) original programming
Czech television miniseries